Thomas F. Loertscher (born January 4, 1944, in Park City, Utah) is an American politician, and former Republican member of the Idaho House of Representatives, in the District 32 B seat.

Education
Loertscher graduated from Park City High School and earned his BS in accounting from the University of Utah.

Elections

2020 
Loertscher took second losing to Jon Walker in the Republican Primary for Bonneville County Commissioner District 2.

2018 
After losing in the 2018 Republican Primary to challenger Chad Christensen, Loertscher abandoned his Republican Party affiliation to run an Independent write-in campaign for his legislative seat. Loertscher went on to the November general election to lose to Christensen again, 2,247 votes to Christensen's 11,044. Butch Otter would later be censured over his support over the independent run by the Idaho Republican Party.

2012 
Loertscher was redistricted to District 32, and with Republican Representative Erik Simpson not running, Loertscher won the three-way May 15, 2012 Republican Primary with 4,257 votes (54.4%), and won the November 6, 2012 General election with 14,416 votes (73.7%) against Democratic nominee Ralph Mossman, his challenger from 2008 and 2010.

2010 
Loertscher and Mossman were both unopposed for their May 25, 2010 primaries, setting up a rematch; Loertscher won his with 6,003 votes, and won the November 2, 2010 General Election with 9,965 votes (68.4%) against Mossman.

2008 
Loertscher won the four-way May 27, 2008 Republican Primary with 3,157 votes (44.4%), and won the November 4, 2008 General Election with 15,421 votes (98.2%) against write-in candidate Ralph Mossman.

2006 
Langford challenged Loertscher in a rematch for the May 23, 2006 Republican Primary; Loertscher won with 3,697 votes (56.3%), and was unopposed for the November 7, 2006 General Election, winning with 12,170 votes.

2004 
Loertscher challenged incumbent Republican Representative Eulalie Langford for the District 31 B seat in the May 25, 2004 Republican Primary, and won with 3,953 votes (50.73%), and was unopposed for the November 2, 2004 General election, winning with 14,393 votes.

2002 
Redistricted to 31A, and with Republican Representative Dennis Lake redistricted to 28A, Loertscher lost the May 28, 2002 Republican Primary to Representative Larry Bradford, Bradford won the General election and held the seat until 2008.

2000 
Loertscher won the May 23, 2000 Republican Primary with 2,656 votes (59.9%), and won the November 7,  General election with 8,523 votes (62.4%) against Democratic nominee Claire Ashton-Heckathorn.

1998 
Loertscher was unopposed for both the May 26, 1998 Republican Primary, winning with 3,780 votes, and the November 3, 1998 General election, winning with 9,025 votes

1996 
Loertscher won the May 28, 1996 Republican Primary with 2,291 votes (58%), and won the November 5, 1996 General election with 8,326 votes (63.5%) against Democratic nominee Steven Fernandez.

1994 
Loertscher was unopposed for both the May 24, 1994 Republican Primary, winning with 3,120 votes, and the November 8, 1994 General election, winning with 10,037 votes.

1992 
With Republican Representative JoAn Wood redistricted to District 26A, Loertscher won the District 30 B seat 1992 Republican Primary and the November 3, 1992 General election.

1990 
Loertscher was originally elected in the District 30 D Seat in the November 6, 1990, General election.

References

External links
Thomas F. Loertscher at the Idaho Legislature
Campaign site
 

1944 births
Living people
Republican Party members of the Idaho House of Representatives
People from Bonneville County, Idaho
People from Park City, Utah
United States Army reservists
University of Utah alumni
21st-century American politicians